Ahmad Hassan (born 1947) is a Syrian diplomat and politician who served as information minister from 2003 to 2004.

Early life
Hassan hails from an Alawi family based in Tartous. He was born, in 1947, in a village near Lattakia and later moved to Baniyas.

Career
Hassan served as the head of the first Baathist school in the 1960s. He is a member of Syrian Regional Branch of the Arab Socialist Ba'ath Party and close to former vice president Abdul Halim Khaddam. He was also an auxiliary-member of the National Leadership until 1984 when then president Hafez Assad removed the Khaddam faction from the Leadership.

Hassan served as Syria's ambassador to Iran for a long time since the early 1990s until being replaced by Hamid Hassan in May 2003. He was appointed information minister to the Syrian cabinet in 2003 and replaced Adnan Omran in the post. Hassan's term ended in October 2004, and he was succeeded by Mahdi Dakhlallah as information minister.

References

External links

1947 births
Ambassadors of Syria to Iran
Arab Socialist Ba'ath Party – Syria Region politicians
Living people
People from Tartus
Syrian Alawites
Syrian ministers of information